Svante Nilsson, Svante Edvin Nilsson (10 June 1869 in Stockholm, Sweden – 21 May 1942 in Stockholm) was a Swedish medal engraver, medal artist, lyricist and lute singer.

Biography
When Svante Nilsson was thirteen years old he began to study medal engraving for the Swedish engraver Adolf Lindberg (1839–1916) in Stockholm. Adolf Lindberg was a prestigious and reputable medal engraver in Sweden during the 1800s. After ten years of teaching in Stockholm Svante Nilsson mastered the art of producing the medal stamps. Then he was awarded the scholarship of Kommerskollegium in 1893, that he used to further education in Paris and Rome. Svante Nilsson remained in Paris. He collaborated with the Swedish medal engraver Sven Kulle (1860–1945), who resided in Paris in France.  Sven Kulle had established a studio in Paris in 1891 where, among others, Svante Nilsson was employed. At the same time Nilsson also studied at École des Arts Décoratifs, a public university of art and design in Paris, the school is one of the most prestigious French grande école, and at Académie Colarossi, another art school in Paris. Svante Nilsson participated in several exhibitions during his years in Paris and he played a significant role in the Swedish art colony. His home became a gathering place for the Swedish art students. He stayed in Paris from 1893 to 1914. He returned to Sweden when the first world war broke out in 1914.

Meritorious medals and plaques
Svante Nilsson has made many meritorious medals and plaques of famous people, such as the Swedish architect Ragnar Östberg, the Swedish architect and interior designer Carl Westman, the Swedish governor and senator Gustaf Tornérhjelm and the Swedish politician, party leader and Prime Minister of Sweden Hjalmar Branting.

Represented
Svante Nilsson is represented at Nationalmuseum in Stockholm, Kungliga Myntkabinettet in Gamla stan in Stockholm, a Swedish museum in the Old Town of Stockholm. Sweden's premier, very rich coin and medal collections are to be found in Kungliga Myntkabinettet, not to be confused by Kungliga Myntet, Stockholm, where most of the medal stomping are stored. Svante Nilsson is also represented in Svenska statens porträttsamling at Gripsholm Castle in Mariefred. Now the castle is a museum which is open to the public, containing paintings and works of art. Part of the castle houses the National Collection of Portraits (Statens porträttsamlingar), one of the oldest portrait collection in the world.

Musician
As a musician Svante Nilsson was an appreciated and popular lute singer. His speciality was Carl Michael Bellman (1740–1795), a Swedish poet and composer in the 18th century, and old French songs.

Notes
A namesake of Svante Nilsson was the Swedish nobleman, statesman and regent in 1504–1512, born about 1460 and died 2 January 1512, also called Svante Nilsson Sture.  Svante Nilsson (regent of Sweden) (1460–1512). See also Svante Nilsson Sture
Svante Nilsson's namesake Svante Nilsson Sture (1460–1512) was chosen to regent in 1504. He had a troubled regent time and the country was plagued of bad finances.
Engraving is the practice of incising a design on to a hard, usually flat surface, by cutting grooves into it. The result may be a decorated object in itself, as when silver, gold, steel, or glass are engraved, or may provide an intaglio printing plate, of copper or another metal, for printing images on paper as prints or illustrations; these images are also called engravings.

References

Sources
Svante Nilsson in Konstnärslexikonett Amanda (Swedish)
Svante Nilsson in Projekt Runeberg, Svensk Konst, Nordisk Familjebok, page 677 (1926) Nordisk Familjebok, Uggleupplagan. 38. Supplement. Riksdagens bibliotek-Öyen. Tillägg. Page 677-678, 1926.

1869 births
1942 deaths
19th-century engravers
20th-century engravers
Swedish engravers
Swedish songwriters
Medallists
20th-century sculptors
19th-century sculptors
Académie Colarossi alumni